Greetje Kraan (sometimes misspelled as Geertje) is a former Dutch swimmer. As part of the national team, she won the 1958 European Aquatics Championships in the 4×100 m freestyle relay and broke two world records in the 4×100 m medley relay (1956 and 1957). In 1957, she also set a European record in the 100 m freestyle (25 m pool).

References

Year of birth missing (living people)
Living people
Dutch female freestyle swimmers
European Aquatics Championships medalists in swimming
Sportspeople from Hilversum
20th-century Dutch women